The 68th Pennsylvania House of Representatives District is located in northern Pennsylvania, and has been represented by Clinton D. Owlett since 2018.

District profile
The 68th District encompasses parts of Bradford County and all of Tioga County, and includes the following areas:

Bradford County

 Alba
 Armenia Township
Burlington
Burlington Township
 Canton
 Canton Township
 Columbia Township
Franklin Township
 Granville Township
Leroy Township
Monroe
Monroe Township
North Towanda
Overton Township
 Ridgebury Township
 Smithfield Township
 South Creek Township
 Springfield Township
 Sylvania
Towanda Township
 Troy
 Troy Township
 Wells Township
 West Burlington Township

Tioga County

Representatives

References

External links
District map from the United States Census Bureau
Pennsylvania House Legislative District Maps from the Pennsylvania Redistricting Commission.  
Population Data for District 68 from the Pennsylvania Redistricting Commission.
Bradford County (Bradford)
Potter County (Potter)

Government of Bradford County, Pennsylvania
Government of Potter County, Pennsylvania
Government of Tioga County, Pennsylvania
68